Alice of Saluzzo, Countess of Arundel (died 25 September 1292) also known as Alesia di Saluzzo, was a Savoyard noblewoman and an English countess. She was daughter of Thomas I of Saluzzo, and the wife of Richard Fitzalan, 8th Earl of Arundel. She assumed the title of Countess of Arundel in 1289.

Family
Alice was born on an unknown date in Saluzzo (present-day Province of Cuneo, Piedmont); the second-eldest daughter of Thomas I, 4th Margrave of Saluzzo, and Luigia di Ceva, daughter of Giorgio, Marquis of Ceva. Alice had fifteen siblings. Her father was a very wealthy and cultured nobleman under whose rule Saluzzo achieved a prosperity, freedom and greatness it had never known previously. She was niece of Alasia of Saluzzo, who in 1247 had married an English nobleman, Edmund de Lacy, Baron of Pontefract, and was a more distant kinswoman of Eleanor of Provence, queen consort of Henry III of England.

Marriage and issue
Sometime before 1285, Alice married Richard Fitzalan, feudal lord of Clun and Oswestry in the Welsh Marches, the son of John Fitzalan, 7th Earl of Arundel and Isabella Mortimer. Richard would succeed to the title of Earl of Arundel in 1289, thus making Alice the 8th Countess of Arundel. Her marriage had been arranged by her kinswoman, the widowed queen consort Eleanor. 

Richard and Alice's principal residence was Marlborough Castle in Wiltshire, but Richard also held Arundel Castle in Sussex and the castles of Clun and Oswestry in Shropshire. Her husband was knighted by King Edward I in 1289, and fought in the Welsh Wars (1288–1294), and later in the Scottish Wars. The marriage produced four children:

 Edmund FitzAlan, 2nd Earl of Arundel (1 May 1285 – 17 November 1326 by execution), married Alice de Warenne, by whom he had issue.
 John FitzAlan, a priest
 Alice FitzAlan (died 7 September 1340), married Stephen de Segrave, 3rd Lord Segrave, by whom she had issue.
 Margaret FitzAlan, married William le Botiller, by whom she had issue.
 Eleanor FitzAlan, married Henry de Percy, 1st Baron Percy, by whom she had issue.

Alice died on 25 September 1292 and was buried in Haughmond Abbey, Shropshire. Alice's husband Richard died on 9 March 1302 and was buried alongside her. In 1341, provision was made for twelve candles to be burned beside their tombs. The abbey is now a ruin as the result of a fire during the English Civil War.

References

13th-century births
Year of birth unknown
1292 deaths
People from Saluzzo
Italian countesses
English countesses
Aleramici
FitzAlan family
Burials at Haughmond Abbey
13th-century English people
13th-century English women
14th-century Italian nobility
14th-century Italian women